Joachim Gérard and Gordon Reid defeated Gustavo Fernández and Alfie Hewett in the final, 6–3, 3–6, [10–3] to win the men's doubles wheelchair tennis title at the 2017 Australian Open. With the win, Reid completed the career Grand Slam.

Stéphane Houdet and Nicolas Peifer were the defending champions, but were defeated by Fernández and Hewett in the semifinals.

Seeds

Draw

Draw

External links
 Main Draw 

Wheelchair Men's Doubles
2017 Men's Doubles